Disney Junior is a British-managed French pay television preschool channel owned and operated by The Walt Disney Company Limited, aimed for kids 3 to 7 years old.

It was launched on 2 November 2002, as Playhouse Disney, and rebranded as Disney Junior on 28 May 2011.

History 
It began back on 2 November 2002 as Playhouse Disney, along with Disney Channel +1 and Toon Disney (later Disney Cinemagic in 2007), and was previously broadcast 15 hours a day from 6:00 am to 9:00 pm (UTC+01:00).

In July 2010, Disney Channel in the U.S. announced to rebrand Playhouse Disney to Disney Junior, It take place back on 28 May 2011, follows the launch of the HD version.

External links
 Disney Junior TV Schedule (in French)

References 

Television stations in France
France
Television channels and stations established in 2002